Allen T. Brinsmade (March 29, 1837 – November 16, 1913) was a Republican politician from Cleveland, Ohio, United States who was President of the Ohio State Senate 1872–73, and was later United States Attorney for the Northern District of Ohio.

Early life
Allen T. Brinsmade was born at Claridon, Geauga County, Ohio, on March 29, 1837. When he was six years old, his family moved to Chagrin Falls, Ohio, where he grew up.

Education 
He graduated from Western Reserve College in 1860 and Cleveland Law College in 1861, being admitted to the bar that year in Cleveland.

Career
Brinsmade was assistant city attorney of Cleveland 1863 to 1866. He enlisted for 100 days in the 150th Ohio Infantry in 1864, and was stationed in Washington, D.C. In 1866 he was elected city attorney of Cleveland, and was elected to the Ohio State Senate in 1871. He was president pro-tem that term.

Brinsmade returned to the law firm Brinsmade & Stone, and was appointed an aide on the staff of Ohio Governor Rutherford B. Hayes in 1876. In 1877, he was appointed a colonel in the Ohio National Guard. He was elected to Cleveland City Council in 1884, and in 1885 was elected to a four-year term as city solicitor, to which he was re-elected in 1889. He was chairman of the Republican state committee 1887–1888.

From December 23, 1890, to 1895, Brinsmade was United States Attorney for the Northern District of Ohio.

Death
Brinsmade died November 16, 1913, and is interred at Lake View Cemetery.

Notes

References

External links
 

1837 births
1913 deaths
Burials at Lake View Cemetery, Cleveland
Case Western Reserve University alumni
Cleveland City Council members
Ohio lawyers
People of Ohio in the American Civil War
Politicians from Cleveland
People from Geauga County, Ohio
Presidents of the Ohio State Senate
Republican Party Ohio state senators
United States Attorneys for the Northern District of Ohio
19th-century American politicians
People from Chagrin Falls, Ohio
19th-century American lawyers